Harold Vernon Froehlich (born May 12, 1932) is a retired American politician and judge.  He represented Wisconsin's 8th congressional district in the United States House of Representatives for one term in 1973–1974 as a Republican and broke with his party to vote for the impeachment of President Richard M. Nixon.

After leaving Congress, he served thirty years—from 1981 to 2011—as a Wisconsin Circuit Court Judge in Outagamie County.  Earlier in his career, he served ten years in the Wisconsin State Assembly and was the 66th Speaker of the Wisconsin Assembly.  His final public office was on the Wisconsin Government Accountability Board, where he served until its dissolution in 2015.

Biography
Born in Appleton, Wisconsin, Froehlich served in the United States Navy during the Korean War after graduating from Appleton Senior High School in 1950. In 1959, Froehlich graduated from the University of Wisconsin–Madison and then received his law degree in 1962.  That same year, he was elected to his first term in the Wisconsin State Assembly.  He would ultimately serve ten years in the Assembly, and was chosen as Speaker during the 1967–1968 and 1969–1970 sessions.

Besides being involved with politics he is also a certified public accountant and real estate broker. He is a former treasurer for the Black Creek Improvement Corp and former president of 322 Investment, Ltd.

He was elected to the 93rd United States Congress in 1972 to the replacing the retiring incumbent John W. Byrnes in Wisconsin's 8th congressional district.  He lost his reelection bid to Democrat Robert John Cornell in the wave election of 1974, following the resignation of President Richard Nixon. Froehlich had voted for the impeachment of President Nixon as a member of the House Judiciary Committee.  During his term in Congress, he hired future Wisconsin Supreme Court Justice David Prosser, Jr., as a legislative aide.

Governor Lee S. Dreyfus appointed Froehlich to the Wisconsin Circuit Court in Outagamie County in 1981.  He was elected to a full term on the court in 1982 and was subsequently re-elected in 1988, 1994, 2000, and 2006.  The Wisconsin Supreme Court selected Judge Froehlich as Chief Judge for the 8th Judicial Administrative for the maximum 3 two-year terms from 1988 to 1994.  He retired from the court on April 8, 2011.

In 2013, Governor Scott Walker appointed Judge Froehlich to the Wisconsin Government Accountability Board.  Judge Froehlich served as vice chair of the board in 2014.  The Government Accountability Board was abolished by legislation signed by Governor Walker in 2015.

During his career, Judge Froehlich served as president of the Wisconsin Trial Judges Association and was a delegate to the National Conference of State Trial Judges.  Judge Froehlich was named "Judge of the Year" in 1999 by the Bench Bar committee of the State Bar of Wisconsin.  In 2013, the state bar honored him with a Lifetime Jurist Achievement Award, where he was praised by his former legislative aide, Justice David Prosser, Jr.  The American Judges Association created the "Harold Froehlich Award for Judicial Courage" in 2013, to "recognize the highest level of judicial courage in the service of justice."

Toilet paper panic
Froehlich represented a district in which the paper industry is a major employer.  Prompted by concern from the industry, on December 11, 1973, Froehlich issued a press release declaring, "The U.S. may face a shortage of toilet paper within a few months," and alluded to rationing as a possible solution. The release made it into major newspapers and to Johnny Carson.  On December 19, Carson told his audience of tens of millions in his Tonight Show monologue that there was a shortage of toilet paper.  Primed by recent shortages of other kinds of paper along with gasoline and meat, consumers went out the next day and hoarded toilet paper, emptying store shelves.  The run on toilet paper continued for three weeks, until consumers saw that stores were being restocked and that there was therefore no shortage. The incident was the subject of a short film released in early 2020 by documentary filmmaker Brian Gersten, The Great Toilet Paper Scare.

Electoral history

Wisconsin Assembly (1962, 1964, 1966, 1968, 1970)

U.S. House of Representatives (1972, 1974)

| colspan="6" style="text-align:center;background-color: #e9e9e9;"| Republican Primary, September 12, 1972

| colspan="6" style="text-align:center;background-color: #e9e9e9;"| General Election, November 7, 1972

| colspan="6" style="text-align:center;background-color: #e9e9e9;"| General Election, November 5, 1974

Wisconsin Circuit Court (1982, 1988, 1994, 2000, 2006)

| colspan="6" style="text-align:center;background-color: #e9e9e9;"| General Election, April 6, 1982

| colspan="6" style="text-align:center;background-color: #e9e9e9;"| General Election, April 5, 1988

References

External links
 
 

|-

1932 births
Living people
Republican Party members of the Wisconsin State Assembly
Speakers of the Wisconsin State Assembly
Wisconsin state court judges
American Lutherans
Politicians from Appleton, Wisconsin
Military personnel from Wisconsin
University of Wisconsin–Madison alumni
University of Wisconsin Law School alumni
Republican Party members of the United States House of Representatives from Wisconsin
Toilet paper
21st-century American lawyers
20th-century American lawyers
20th-century American politicians
21st-century American politicians
20th-century American judges
21st-century American judges
American real estate brokers